The following lists events that happened during 1825 in Chile.

Incumbents
Supreme Director of Chile: Ramón Freire

Events

January
7 January - Parliament of Tapihue

Births
date unknown - Juan Williams Rebolledo (d. 1910)
15 March - Aníbal Pinto (d. 1884)
25 April - Federico Errázuriz Zañartu (d. 1877)
4 August - Domingo Santa María (d. 1889)
18 December - Patricio Lynch (d. 1886)

Deaths
8 February - Naihekukui
16 March - Camilo Henríquez (b. 1769)

References 

 
1820s in Chile
Chile
Chile